Amantur Ismailov (born 29 December 1997) is a Kyrgyzstani Greco-Roman wrestler. He won one of the bronze medals in the 67 kg event at the 2018 Asian Games held in Jakarta, Indonesia. Bronze medalist at the 2022 World Wrestling Championships held in Belgrad, Serbia.

Career 

At the 2019 Asian U23 Wrestling Championship in Ulaanbaatar, Mongolia, he won the bronze medal in the 67 kg event.

In 2021, he won one of the bronze medals in the 67 kg event at the Asian Wrestling Championships held in Almaty, Kazakhstan. In May 2021, he failed to qualify for the 2020 Summer Olympics at the World Olympic Qualification Tournament held in Sofia, Bulgaria.

He won the silver medal in his event at the 2021 Islamic Solidarity Games held in Konya, Turkey. He competed in the 67 kg event at the 2022 World Wrestling Championships held in Belgrade, Serbia and won bronze medal.

Achievements

References

External links 
 

Living people
1997 births
Sportspeople from Bishkek
Kyrgyzstani male sport wrestlers
Wrestlers at the 2018 Asian Games
Asian Games medalists in wrestling
Asian Games bronze medalists for Kyrgyzstan
Medalists at the 2018 Asian Games
Asian Wrestling Championships medalists
Islamic Solidarity Games medalists in wrestling
Islamic Solidarity Games competitors for Kyrgyzstan
21st-century Kyrgyzstani people